Zoveyr may refer to:
 Zoveyr-e Chari
 Zoveyr-e Kharamzeh

See also
 Zuair